Maurice Lauze (1 September 1922 – 28 April 2017) was a French racing cyclist. He rode in the 1948 Tour de France.

References

External links
 

1922 births
2017 deaths
French male cyclists
Sportspeople from Tizi Ouzou